Binneya is a genus of air-breathing land slugs, shell-less terrestrial gastropod mollusks in the family Binneyidae.

Binneya is the type genus of the family Binneyidae.

Species
Species within the genus Binneya include:
 Binneya notabilis - Santa Barbara shelled slug

References 

Binneyidae
Taxonomy articles created by Polbot